vWorkApp is an online dispatch and job scheduling software for medium to large businesses.  The product is sold and distributed over the Internet using a distribution model commonly known as cloud computing.

History

The company was founded in 2008 and has offices in Auckland, New Zealand; Brisbane, Australia; and San Francisco, United States. The Board of Directors includes Sam Morgan, who founded New Zealand’s highest-traffic website TradeMe in 1999 and sold it for NZ$700 million in 2006.

Product 

vWorkApp is an online job dispatch and scheduling product for transportation and services industries. Some of vWorkApp's features include GPS tracking, step-by-step job instructions, automatic data synchronization, electronic signature capturing, and built in reporting. The vWorkApp smartphone application is currently available for the Android OS and iOS.

With vWorkApp, a dispatcher can create and schedule jobs for mobile workers via an account on the app's website. After a dispatcher schedules a job, mobile workers receive real-time push technology notifications with job details on their smartphones.

The dispatcher will receive real-time updates when a mobile worker edits job details, completes a job, etc. within the smartphone application.

Awards 

In July, 2011 vWorkApp won the TUANZ Mobile Application of the Year Award.

References

External links
 vWorkApp homepage

Software companies of New Zealand